Luis Manuel Narváez Pitalua (born 11 July 1984) is a Colombian professional footballer who plays as a defensive midfielder and occasionally centre back for Categoría Primera B club Unión Magdalena.

Honours

Club
Atlético Junior
Categoría Primera A: 2011-II, 2018-II, 2019-I
Copa Colombia: 2015, 2017
Superliga Colombiana: 2019

References

External links

1984 births
Living people
Colombian footballers
Association football midfielders
Categoría Primera A players
Categoría Primera B players
Unión Magdalena footballers
Cúcuta Deportivo footballers
Atlético Junior footballers
Sportspeople from Barranquilla
20th-century Colombian people
21st-century Colombian people